This is a list of media services in Quincy, Illinois/Hannibal, Missouri/Keokuk, Iowa Arbitron market.

Television

Received radio stations

FM stations

AM stations

Weatherband

Periodicals 

 Arts/Quincy – distributed and printed by the Quincy Society of Fine Arts;  a black and white news article published every week about the culture, history, and art of Quincy
 Quincy Herald-Whig – the major newspaper in the region, printed by Quincy Newspapers and shipped throughout much of the Tri-State region
 Quincy Rhythm

Web 

 Quincy Journal –  established in 2011 and published by STARadio Corporation; provides online local, political and business news for Quincy and the surrounding area
 QuincyNews.org –  established in 2008 and published by Quincy Home Page, Inc.;  an independent community driven news resource that provides online local, regional and business news for Quincy and Adams County

Quincy, Illinois
Quincy–Hannibal area